Muslim Sahitya-Samaj was an influential literary and cultural organization. It was based in Dhaka.

History
Muslim Sahitya-Samaj (Muslim Literary society) was founded on 19 January 1926 in a meeting at Muslim Hall Union office. The meeting was presided by Muhammad Shahidullah, professor at the Department of Bengali and Sanskrit in Dhaka University. Professor Abul Husain, Department of Economics and Commerce of Dhaka University,  A F M Abdul Huq, a student of Dhaka University residing in Muslim Hall, and Abdul Qadir, a student of Dhaka Collegiate School were charged with running the organisation and were the first executive committee of the society. Professors Kazi Abdul Wadud and Anwarul Qadir.

The Muslim Sahitya-Samaj operated for a total of 11 years before becoming dormant. Professor Charu Chandra Bandopaddhay presided over the first session of the organization. In 1938, there were attempts to revive the organization but they did not succeed an after 1939 all activities stopped. Despite having Muslim in the name, it was a secular organization that had none-Muslim Bengali speakers. They supported Freedom of intellect and encourage secular traditions. It aim was encourage the education of Muslims. The organization was by choice non-political. It was an organization of students and teachers.

Publication
Shikha was the official journal of the Muslim Sahitya-Samaj. The first issue of the journal was published in April 1927. The Editor of the magazine was Professor Abul Hussain of the economics department of Dhaka University. The official slogan of the magazine was "'Where knowledge is limited, intellect is inert, freedom is impossible".

References

Indic literature societies
Bengali literary institutions
Organisations based in Dhaka
1926 establishments in India
Islam in Dhaka